Chojny may refer to the following places:

Chojny, Greater Poland Voivodeship (west-central Poland)
Chojny, Kuyavian-Pomeranian Voivodeship (north-central Poland)
Chojny, Łódź Voivodeship (central Poland)
Chojny Młode, Podlaskie Voivodeship (north-eastern Poland)
Stare Chojny, Podlaskie Voivodeship (north-eastern Poland)